Jack Westwood (born March 6, 1944) is an American former politician, who was Republican member of the Kentucky Senate. Westwood represented District 23 from January 1997 to January 2023. Prior to politics, he was an English and journalism teacher from 1966 to 1993. He served on the Erlanger-Elsmere School Board from 1995 to 1996. He resides in Erlanger, Kentucky.

References 

1944 births
21st-century American politicians
Living people
Republican Party Kentucky state senators